The SRI Conference is the annual national conference of the sustainable and responsible investing (SRI) industry.  The conference was founded in 1990 by George R. Gay, and has grown from 45 to over 1,200 participants.  Attendees include investment professionals in the SRI industry:  licensed investment professionals, SRI mutual fund companies, asset managers, community development financial institutions, social research and proxy voting organizations, faith-based institutional investors, and social change non-profits.

Agenda
The SRI Conference agenda is divided into four tracks:  ESG Integration/Portfolio Management, Impact Investing, Shareowner Engagement, and Practice Management for Financial Planners and Investment Advisors.

Location
The SRI Conference, formerly SRI in the Rockies, convenes throughout the United States, and occasionally in Canada.

Carbon Offsets
The SRI Conference, formerly SRI in the Rockies, purchases carbon offsets to cover meeting and lodging room space and staff travel.  NativeEnergy has been the carbon offset provider since 2006, providing support to alternative energy projects on Native American lands and elsewhere.

Conference Venue Requirements
The SRI Conference requires prospective venues to complete the Best Practice Survey of the Green Hotel Initiative.  In addition, selection criteria include a review of the venue’s environmental practices, the property’s carbon footprint, availability of locally grown and/or organic food products, access to public transportation, recycling practices, and cultural sensitivity to Native American or First Nations images, language, and cultural or religious sites.

Conference Producers
The SRI Conference is produced by First Affirmative Financial Network, LLC. The company, based in Colorado Springs, Colorado, is an Independent Registered Investment Advisor.

See also
AdvisorShares
Carbon offset
Community development financial institution
Corporate social responsibility
Environmental, social and corporate governance
Ethical banking
Interfaith Center on Corporate Responsibility
Socially responsible investing
Sustainability reporting
Triple bottom line

Conferences in the United States
Ethical investment